Microeurydemus semivittatus is a species of leaf beetle. It is distributed in Somalia, Saudi Arabia and Yemen. It was first described by Martin Jacoby in 1899.

References

Eumolpinae
Beetles of Africa
Beetles of Asia
Insects of Somalia
Insects of the Arabian Peninsula
Taxa named by Martin Jacoby
Beetles described in 1899